Drosh  is a city located in the Chitral District of the Khyber Pakhtunkhwa Province of Pakistan.The city has a population of about 20,000 people.

History

Drosh town was the property of Mehtar of Chitral. Mehtar appointed his close relative as governor of Drosh. During the regime of the great Mehtar of Chitral (Aman UL Mulk), his brother Kohkan Baig, was governor of Drosh. After 14 years, his attitude changed towards Afghanistan and Mehtar Aman UL Mulk appointed his son, Prince Shah UL Mulk, as governor of Drosh in 1872.  Shah ul Mulk was governor of Drosh from 1872 to 1892. During that time, Drosh province was from Broze to Chaqansarai (Afghanistan). After the murder of Shah ul Mulk, Kohkan Baig became governor of Drosh for the second time. Later, Kohkan Baig supported his other brother Sher Afzal. From 1892 to 1932 there was no strong governor in Drosh. In 1932, Mehtar Shuja UL Mulk appointed his son, Prince Hissam UL Mulk, as governor of Drosh. He was a very strong governor with full power. He remained governor until 1947. In 1947, Chitral state was merged with Pakistan.

Geography

Drosh is located on 35° 33' 33" N and 71° 47' 44" E  on  the banks of the Landai Sin River (Bashgal River) just above its intersection with the Kunar River (Chitral River), along the Drosh-Jalalabad Road. The Drosh-Jalalabad Road, including water traffic along the Kunar, used to be part of a major trade route from India to Kabul. Drosh is built on river benches that rise above the agricultural fields next to the two rivers. The land is fertile.Drosh is one of the most densely populated areas in Chitral. Administratively, it is divided into five Union Councils .i.e. UC Sheshekoh Valley, UC Drosh 1, UC Drosh 2, UC Ashurate, and UC Arando. After the 2013 local government Act of Khyber Pakhtunkwha, these union councils were further devolved into twenty-two village councils. It has given the status of tehsil and TMO was also established in 2017.
main villages included ziarat, sweer

Demography

Ethnically, most residents are Khos and Pashtuns.

Khowar and Pashto languages are the languages spoken by the majority of the people in Drosh. Drosh is low elevation and is a large village in Chitral District on the traditional trade route to Drosh-Jalalabad Road.

After Khowar, Pashto is also spoken and understood. Because most of the Pashto speakers are from the surrounding areas like Dir, Afghanistan, they settled in the area.

Climate
The climate in Drosh is warm and temperate. The rain in Drosh falls mostly in the winter, with relatively little rain in the summer. This location is classified as Csa by Köppen and Geiger. The average annual temperature in Drosh is 17.1 °C. The average annual rainfall is 676 mm. Drosh has a Mediterranean climate (Köppen climate classification Csa) with hot, mostly dry summers and cool moist winters with some snow.

<div style="width:100%;">

Educational institutions

Drosh Public School & Degree College Drosh
Govt girls degree college Shahnigar Drosh
Govt Higher Secondary School Drosh (Boys)
Frontier Corps Public School & College
Govt High School Drosh
Govt Girls High School Drosh
Govt Girls Degree College kotgal gol Drosh
Hira Model school, Degree College & College of Education Drosh
Jinnah Public School & Degree College Drosh
The Learner's School Drosh
Iqra Hadiqat-ul-atfal school
Muslim Model School Drosh
RITE(Regional Institute for Teachers Training) Drosh
Muslim Model School and College Bazar Drosh
Muslim Model School Shahniga Drosh

See also 

 Arandu
 Chitral District

References

External links
Khyber-Pakhtunkhwa Government website section on Lower Dir
United Nations

Chitral District
Populated places in Chitral District
Tehsils of Chitral District
Union councils of Chitral District